Astathes is a genus of longhorn beetles of the subfamily Lamiinae.

subgenus Africastathes
 Astathes distincta (Hintz, 1919)
 Astathes leonensis Breuning, 1956

subgenus Astathes
 Astathes bigemmata Thomson, 1865
 Astathes holorufa Breuning, 1968
 Astathes perplexa Newman, 1842
 Astathes posticata Gahan, 1901

subgenus Tetraophthalmus
 Astathes annamensis Breuning, 1956
 Astathes batoeensis Breuning, 1956
 Astathes bella Gahan, 1901
 Astathes bimaculata (Fabricius, 1792)
 Astathes bimaculatoides Breuning, 1971
 Astathes bipartita Thomson, 1865
 Astathes caloptera Pascoe, 1860
 Astathes cincta Gahan, 1901
 Astathes contentiosa Pascoe, 1867
 Astathes costipennis Fisher, 1935
 Astathes cupripennis Breuning, 1956
 Astathes cyanoptera Gahan, 1900
 Astathes dimidiata (Gory, 1844)
 Astathes episcopalis Chevrolat, 1852
 Astathes fasciata Gahan, 1901  
 Astathes flaviventris Pascoe, 1867
 Astathes formosana Breuning, 1956
 Astathes fulgida (Fabricius, 1801)
 Astathes fulgidior Breuning, 1956
 Astathes gemmula Thomson, 1865
 Astathes gibbicollis Thomson, 1865
 Astathes ignorantina (J. Thomson, 1857)
 Astathes janthinipennis Fairmaire, 1895
 Astathes japonica (J. Thomson, 1857)
 Astathes laosensis Pic, 1939
 Astathes lemoides Thomson, 1865
 Astathes levis Newman, 1842
 Astathes nigrofasciata Breuning, 1956
 Astathes nitens (Fabricius, 1801)
 Astathes partita Gahan, 1901
 Astathes pseudopartita Breuning, 1956
 Astathes purpurea Pascoe, 1857
 Astathes sikanga (Gressitt, 1942)
 Astathes splendida (Fabricius, 1792)
 Astathes straminea Pascoe, 1857
 Astathes terminata Pascoe, 1857
 Astathes velata Thomson, 1865
 Astathes violaceipennis (Thomson, 1857)
 Astathes violaceoplagiata Breuning, 1956

References